Yeli Daraq may refer to:
 Yeli Daraq-e Olya
 Yeli Daraq-e Sofla